Beijing Observatory or Peking Observatory may refer to:

 Beijing Ancient Observatory, the dynasty astronomical observatory for the Ming and Qing dynasties
 Beijing Astronomical Observatory, the post-Communist revolution observatory
 Beijing Planetarium

See also
 National Astronomical Observatory of China, headquartered in Beijing